Centerville is a borough in Crawford County, Pennsylvania, United States. The population was 178 at the 2020 census, down from 218 at the 2010 census. It was established in 1812.

Geography
Centerville is located in eastern Crawford County at  (41.736376, -79.760965). It is bordered by Rome Township to the north, east, and south; by Steuben Township to the southwest; and by Athens Township to the west.

Natural features
Centerville Borough is located just north of the southern terminal moraine for glaciation in northwestern Pennsylvania. The borough is drained by Oil Creek, a southward-flowing tributary of the Allegheny River, which runs through the western side of town and East Branch Oil Creek, which enters the borough from the northeast and joins the main creek west of the borough center.

Major Roads

Pennsylvania Route 8 passes through Centerville, leading north  to Union City and south  to Titusville.

Demographics

As of the census of 2000, there were 247 people, 99 households, and 67 families residing in the borough. The population density was 138.3 people per square mile (53.3/km²). There were 109 housing units at an average density of 61.0/sq mi (23.5/km²). The racial makeup of the borough was 98.79% White, 0.40% Asian, and 0.81% from two or more races.

There were 99 households, out of which 25.3% had children under the age of 18 living with them, 64.6% were married couples living together, 1.0% had a female householder with no husband present, and 32.3% were non-families. 24.2% of all households were made up of individuals, and 10.1% had someone living alone who was 65 years of age or older. The average household size was 2.49 and the average family size was 3.06.

In the borough the population was spread out, with 21.9% under the age of 18, 7.7% from 18 to 24, 29.1% from 25 to 44, 24.7% from 45 to 64, and 16.6% who were 65 years of age or older. The median age was 41 years. For every 100 females there were 109.3 males. For every 100 females age 18 and over, there were 105.3 males.

The median income for a household in the borough was $29,318, and the median income for a family was $32,778. Males had a median income of $30,417 versus $22,083 for females. The per capita income for the borough was $12,860. About 13.4% of families and 17.6% of the population were below the poverty line, including 34.8% of those under the age of eighteen and none of those sixty-five or over.

References

Populated places established in 1812
Boroughs in Crawford County, Pennsylvania
1812 establishments in Pennsylvania